Julien Favier (born September 28, 1980 in Carcassonne) is a French professional football player. Currently, he plays in the Championnat de France amateur for RCO Agde.

He played on the professional level in Ligue 2 for FC Sète.

1980 births
Living people
French footballers
Ligue 2 players
FC Sète 34 players
RCO Agde players
US Marseille Endoume players
Association football midfielders